is a Japanese professional race car driver, who last competed in 2003.

Career
Igarashi competed in British Formula 3 in the late 1990s before returning to Japan to compete in the 2000 Formula Nippon Championship with Team LeMans. He drove 10 races and scored 1 point, finishing 13th in the Drivers Championship. He would race in Formula Nippon for the next two seasons, with Team LeMans and Mooncraft. He scored no further points in the series. In 2003, he raced three times for Team Nova, again scoring no points.

Alongside his Formula Nippon racing, Igarashi raced GT cars. In 2000, competing in the All Japan Grand Touring Car Championship Japan GT300 series with Super Autobacs Racing driving a Toyota MR-S. The team scored 13 points and finished the championship in 16th place. In 2002, he completed 3 races in the series for HKS driving a Mercedes CLK in the GT500 class. The following year, he returned to the GT500 class this time with Hitotsuyama Racing. He completed 4 races driving their McLaren F1 GTR, scoring 2 points and finishing 32nd in the championship.

Complete Formula Nippon results 
(key) (Races in bold indicate pole position) (Races in italics indicate fastest lap)

Complete All Japan Grand Touring Car Championship GT500 Results
(key) (Races in bold indicate pole position) (Races in italics indicate fastest lap)

External Links
Yudai Igarashi photos - Autosport
Yudai Igarashi - Formula Nippon results - Motorsport Magazine
Yudai Igarashi - Flickr

References 

1978 births
Living people
Japanese racing drivers
Formula Nippon drivers
British Formula Three Championship drivers
Super_GT_drivers

Alan Docking Racing drivers
Team LeMans drivers